Green Thumb is a young-adult novel by Rob Thomas, creator of the television series Veronica Mars. It was published in 1999

Plot summary
Pudgy misanthropic boy genius Grady Jacobs wins a scholarship to participate in rainforest research and conservation. Upon discovering that our Grady is only thirteen, Dr. Carter, the scientist in charge, relegates him to the position of camp drudge. A healthier diet and menial labor transforms Grady both physically and emotionally, making him a better and more balanced boy.

During the course of his duties, Grady somehow discovers a way to communicate with trees. This fantastic power eventually comes in handy when it is discovered that Dr. Carter's project would in fact lead to the destruction of the rainforest.

Reception
Critical reception has been positive. Publishers Weekly and Kirkus Reviews both gave Green Thumb favorable reviews, with Publishers Weekly writing "While this book is aimed at a slightly younger audience than Thomas's previous YA titles, Grady's knowing, flip tone will appeal to Thomas's older teen fans."

References

1999 American novels
American young adult novels
Novels set in South America